Karl Kunisch (born September 16, 1952 in Linz) is an Austrian mathematician.

Life and work 
Kunisch studied mathematics at the Graz University of Technology and at the Northwestern University, Evanston, USA. After his doctorate in 1978 at the Graz University of Technology on the topic of neutral functional-differential equations and semigroup theory, he obtained his habilitation in 1980 at the same university. In the following years, he repeatedly held visiting professor positions at the Lefschetz Center for Dynamical Systems of Brown University, USA.

From 1986 to 1993, Kunisch held a professor position at the Graz University of Technology before moving to the Technical University of Berlin. In 1996, he became Professor of Optimization and Optimal Control at the University of Graz, where he retired in the fall of 2020. Since 2012, he is also Scientific Director of the Johann Radon Institute for Computational and Applied Mathematics (RICAM) in Linz.

Kunisch authored over 360 publications in peer-reviewed journals as well as several books.
He is a member of the editorial board of several mathematical journals including the SIAM Journal on Control and Optimization, SIAM Journal on Numerical Analysis, and the Journal of the European Mathematical Society. 
Between 2007 and 2018, Kunisch was speaker of the collaborative research center Mathematical Optimization and Applications in Biomedical Sciences. funded by the Austrian Science Fund.
In 2008, he was awarded the Alwin-Walther medal of the Technische Universität Darmstadt.
Kunisch was invited speaker at the International Congress of Mathematicians in Hyderabad, 2010.
In 2015, he received an Advanced Grant of the European Research Council on the topic of From Open to Closed Loop Control.
Since 2017, he is a SIAM Fellow of the Society for Industrial and Applied Mathematics (SIAM).
He was awarded the W. T. and Idalia Reid Prize 2021.

Research areas 

 Optimization of partial differential equations
 Mathematical control theory
 Inverse problems and mathematical imaging
 Mathematical modelling in medicine
 Model reduction
 Scientific computing
 Mathematical data science
 Neutral functional-differential equations

Publications (selected)

References 

1952 births
Living people
20th-century Austrian mathematicians
Fellows of the Society for Industrial and Applied Mathematics
People from Linz
21st-century Austrian mathematicians
Academic staff of the Graz University of Technology
Academic staff of the University of Graz
Graz University of Technology alumni
Academic staff of the Technical University of Berlin
Northwestern University alumni
Austrian expatriates in the United States
Austrian expatriates in Germany